Switch, also called Two Four Jacks or Irish Switch, or Last Card, in New Zealand, is a shedding-type card game for two or more players that is popular in the United Kingdom, Ireland and as alternative incarnations in other regions. The sole aim of Switch is to discard all of the cards in one's hand; the first player to play his or her final card, and ergo have no cards left, wins the game. Switch is very similar to the games UNO, Flaps  and Mau Mau, both belonging to the larger Crazy Eights or Shedding family of card games.

The game is also commonly known as Jack Changes, Crazy Eights, Take Two, Black Jack and Peanuckle in the UK and Ireland.

Objective
Switch is played with a regular, single deck of playing cards, or with two standard decks (shuffled into one) if there is a large number of players.

Each player at their turn may play any card from their hand that matches the suit or the rank of the card previously played; for example, if the previous card was a seven of clubs, the next player may put down any seven card, or any club card, from their hand. Should the player not have any card available to play, they must pick up one card.

Game rules
Players are initially dealt a similar-sized hand of cards (often seven per person), but the exact number may vary depending on how many players are present. The remainder of the deck is placed face down and serves as a "pool" or drawing stack. At the beginning of the game, the topmost card from the "pool” is revealed and, so long as this card is not a trick card, play begins. (Switch may not start with a trick card, and so if the "starting card" is a trick card, cards shall continue to be selected from the pool until a non-trick card is revealed.)

The first to play (generally, the player on the dealer's left) should select from his or her hand a card that matches either, the suit or the rank of the open card (the card that is "top"); for example, on a 9 of spades, only a spade card or a 9 may be played. The card played must be of the same value or higher. If a player is not able to place a card, he draws cards from the stack until he can play a card. A player may choose to withhold a card due to personal strategy but will incur the penalty of having to pick a card from the deck.

If the drawing stack is run down and becomes empty, the playing stack or discard pile (except for the topmost card) is shuffled, and placed face down to become the new "pool."

If the last player, at the point of when the second last player has said "Last Card", and has ended the game, the last standing player, or the lost player, can bring the player back into the game, provided the player has all logical moves remaining in hand. If the player does have all logical moves, the second last player is brought back into the game, as a form of resurrection, to re-compete. Should the last player not have all logical moves, that player loses the game.

Power Cards
In Switch some cards are known as "power" or "trick" cards because their being played directly affects the gameplay:

2: If a player places a two (of any suit) down, the next player is required to pick up two cards. One player may not place two 2 cards at the same time. If the next player has a two, they may place it down instead of taking cards, requiring the next player to take four. This continues until a player with no two has to pick up the current total. A player that draws cards after a two has been played is usually not permitted to put any more cards down.
8: The next player misses their turn. Normally, the next player may not play an 8 to continue the power, as they could with the 2; however, if this rule is included, then 8s will continue to be played until the flow reaches a player without an 8, in which case they will miss several turns equivalent to the number of 8s played previously.
Ten: The ten reverses the play direction.
Black Jack: When the Black Jack is played, the next player must pick up the same number of cards dealt or play another Black Jack and the following player must then pick up double that. If a player has both Black Jacks then they can play both of them at the same time, to then cause the next person to pick up.
Red Jack: Is best played when a Black Jack is played as this will cancel the pickup Black Jack rule. One Red Jack cancels one Black Jack.
Ace: can be played regardless of the suit or value of the topmost card on the playing deck—that is, the Ace may be played at any time in the game. When playing an Ace, the player can decide freely the suit that has to be played next; from then on, play continues as normal, but on the suit selected by the player of the Ace.
10: If a player has a 10, they can place any card which goes up or down from 10  For example, if the 10 of hearts is placed, then the player can put down any 9 or Any jack However, after this they have to put down an eight of hearts, or a six of hearts, or a 7 of a different suit, or move on to the next player.

When a player has only one remaining card they must remember to say "last card" aloud before their turn has ended, to inform the other players that they are about to win. If a player should fail to do so before the next player has started their turn they may be penalised, often to the cost of picking up one card immediately (over and above any picking up as a matter of routine course in the game).

Endgame
As soon as a player plays their last card they win the game. If the last card is a power card they must draw another card as a game can not end with a power card. The game can continue until all the players get rid of their cards.
If a player doesn't say "last card" he will pick up two card from main bank

Last Card rule
In some games, the "Last Card Rule" can be applied, whereby if a player is down to one card they must say "Knocking" before their turn ends. If they do not, they must pick up another card (or 5 if playing Turbo Switch). Although not an official rule, it is a rule widely accepted across Ireland and the UK. A player can also not end on a double of one card.

Variations

Black Jack

"Black Jack" is the name of a shedding card game which shares its name with the casino card game Blackjack, and is sometimes called 7 Card Blackjack to differentiate itself from the other game. It is a variant of Crazy Eights.

Dealing
The dealer deals each player 7 cards (or 5 cards if there are more than 4 people), then places a single card face-up on the table and the remainder of the deck in a pile face-down on the table.

A pre-determined method is used to decide which player plays first. It is usually the player left of the dealer who plays first. The game continues from there going clockwise. Play starts from the single card facing up.

Player turns
On each turn, the player attempts to place cards from their hand onto the stack.
A card can only be placed in the stack if it matches either the rank or suit of the top card.
A player can place consecutive cards of the same suit down to remove more cards.
If a player cannot take their turn, they pick up a card from the remaining deck.
If a player makes an error by placing an illegal card down (putting a card or cards down which goes against the rules of the game such as attempting to put a 7H on top of a 8S, or attempting a run containing one or more illegal cards) or putting a card down a wrong time (when it is not their turn, this is an easy mistake to make such as forgetting that the previous player putting an eight down makes them skip their turn), then this is declared a 'blunder' and the offending player must take back the card(s) they attempted to put down and pick up two more cards from the remaining deck as a penalty.
Once the player has played their turn, they must say "Last card" if they only have one card left. If another player thinks that they can play their cards in one turn they say "cards". If they fail to do so, there is a penalty (see Endgame). An alternate method of doing this is 'knocking'. If a player thinks he can win on his next turn, he must warn the other players by making a knocking noise on the table or by saying 'knocking' (or both). If they fail to do so, there is a penalty.

Magic cards
Certain cards have special effects on the gameplay.

Aces: The player who puts down an ace nominates a new suit, which all the players must follow. The ace can be put down at any time, of any suit, it does not have to follow the suit that the last card was, with a run on top of it if possible. It can also be used to block a two.
Two: The next player is forced to pick up two cards unless he is able to lay another two, black Jack or an ace which makes the next player pick up the cards. Alternatively, a red Jack or an ace can be used to cancel the card pickup.
Seven: All other cards held by that player in the same suit as the 7 may be played.
Eight: The next player misses a turn unless they have an eight.
Black Jack: A Black Jack causes the next player to pick up 5 cards, unless he can follow with another black Jack. If one red Jack is placed, one black Jack is cancelled.
 Red Jack: One red Jack cancels one black Jack.
Queen: A queen must be covered by a card of any suit or rank.
King: Reverses order of play.

Endgame
The first player to get rid of all of their cards wins the game. The game may end once a player has got rid of all of their cards, or the remaining players may continue playing until everyone has got rid of their cards (when done a player is declared to have "got out") bar one player (this player is declared "last place" or "the loser" and may be eliminated if there is an unwieldy number of people wanting to play).

If the player places their last card, but failed to say "last card" at the end of their previous turn, then they must pick up two cards from the remaining deck (even if the player had multiple cards). A player can also declare their final card by 'knocking', usually by tapping the playing table.

Black Jack Variants
 Some variants may include a joker (usually only one, although the players may opt to include 2 jokers).
 The player is not allowed to finish on an ace or any power card
 Multiple cards can be placed on a single turn, where each card matches the previous card in rank or suit. There is no limit to the number of cards which can be played, but the player may not finish by placing more than one card.
 A 3, 7 or 10 is used as the reverse card instead of the king.
 The Queen can be covered by any card, not only one of her suit.
 Runs within a suit are allowed (in both ascending and descending order), for example with a top card of  it would be possible to play 
 The King, when it is not "reverse", is used as a "got to cover" card, in which, the player placing the king must also place a chosen card from the suit of the king.
 A player can end by placing a sequence of cards down.
 When placing "pick up" cards the black jacks and twos can be placed together giving a maximum pick up number of 18, so a move such as  would be a valid and legal move.
 The value of the number of cards required to pick up after a black jack is played varies depending on the number of cards dealt to each player at the beginning of the game.
 Red Jacks do not cancel black Jacks, instead they can be combined with black Jacks. One must pick up three additional cards per red Jack.
 Can be played with two decks of cards if more than five people are playing.
 Is quite similar in several ways to the game Uno.
 The eight is a "play again" card.

These rules tend to lead to faster play, and can make gameplay more exciting as sometimes a large number of cards can be played in a single turn by taking full advantage of both of these rules in a single turn (for instance with the 6 of clubs on top, it would be possible to play  in a single turn).

Using the king and queen rules from the above list, it would be possible to have this as a move, (If the 6 of clubs is on the top of the deck, the next player could play  etc. until they cannot place another card)

Jacks, Twos and Eights
"Jacks Twos and Eights" (J28 for short) evolved from earlier forms of rummy with the intention of being a faster, more complex game.

The deck
J28 is played with a standard 52-card pack of playing cards or if there is a large number of people playing one game then two packs may be mixed together and dealt as normal.

Dealing
Dealership alternates from round to round (the dealer to the first round is usually determined by cutting the deck and then the lowest card deals). The dealer deals a seven-card hand to each player. After seven cards are dealt the next card is placed face up in the centre of the table, this is the "discard" pile. The remainder of the pack is placed face down next to the "discard" pile, and is called the "stock". The next non-dealing player to the right of the dealer lays the first card.

Play
On each turn, a player plays a card or a run of card on to the discard pile. This card must be of the same suit, or the same value, a heart on a heart or a 10 on a 10. Once this card has been laid it is possible for that player to continue laying cards if a run of several cards is possible. There are several possible combinations the run may be formed from:
 The player may lay a set of same value cards, on top of a 10 of hearts they may lay a number of 10s regardless of suit.
 The player may lay a run of numbers either ascending or descending, on top of a 10 of hearts they may lay a 2, 3, 4, 5, of hearts, or a King, Queen, Jack of hearts. The run must not skip numbers, and must be of the same suit as each other and the card they are being laid upon.
 The player may lay a combination of the two above. They may lay a set of same value cards, three 10s then providing that they follow on suit and begin at them next number lay a run of cards, for example. On top of a 10 of hearts a player may lay: 9 of hearts, 9 of spades, 8 of spades, 7 of spades and 7 of clubs. 
 If the player is unable to lay any card then the player must pick up a card from the stock pile. If the player is then able to play then they can lay a card down on this go.

Game rules
There are several rules which apply to certain cards in the game which change how the cards can be laid.

 Jacks can be played at any time on top of any card. Not only can it be played at any time in the game it also allows the player to change the suit of the cards to the one they prefer. For example, if a Jack is played the suit can be changed to hearts, then the player is allowed to lay a heart and any other appropriate cards on that go.
 If a 2 is played then the next player must pick up two cards, unless they can play a 2. This continues around the circle until a player is not able to play a 2. When this happens the player must pick up a number of cards (determined by the number or 2s laid multiplied by 2)
 If an 8 is played the next person in the game must play an 8 also. Again this continues around the circle until a player is unable to lay an eight. This player must then miss a number of goes (determined by the number of 8s laid)
 Another rule is that if a player has an ace of hearts the player next in turn must pick up 5 cards, unless they have an ace of spades, this cancels out the 5 cards they must pick up.
Play continues, until one player no longer has any cards to lay. On a player's last card, “last card” must be said on their previous go in order to allow them to lay the card on their last go. One exception to this is if the player is able to end the game with a run or set of same value cards. The game cannot end on a Jack of any suit, 2 of any suit or 8 of any suit. The winner is the first player to have an empty hand.

Take Two
Very similar to Switch, but with some changes. Played with a 52 card deck (No jokers) or a 54 card deck (With jokers.)

Dealing
The dealer deals each player 5 cards, then places a single card face-up on the table and the remainder of the deck in a pile face-down on the table.

The player left of the dealer plays first. The game continues from there going clockwise. Play starts from the single card facing up.

Rules
The player whose turn it is has to place a card of the same value (eg.  on a ) or of the same suit ( on a ). If the player cannot play any card, they must take two cards from the deck. When a player is on their last card, they must say "last card". A player cannot finish on a trick card. If a player cannot finish, they must take two cards from the deck. If a player makes a mistake (e.g. places a card of the wrong suit down), they must fix the mistake and take two cards from the deck.

The game has trick cards like Switch, but fewer of them:

2 if a player places a two down, the next player is required to pick up two cards. Should that player have a two themself, however, they may place it down, requiring the next player to pick up four. If they have a two, they may place it, requiring the next player to pick up six. This may continue until the flow reaches a player who does not have a two in their hand, at which point they are required to pick up the required number of cards.
8 if a player puts an eight down, the next player misses their go.
Jack The jack can reverse the order of play OR skip a player depending on house rules.
Ace An ace may be placed regardless of the suit, an ace allowing the person who places it to change the suit.

Once a player runs out of cards, they have won, and the game goes on until there is only one person left.

House rules
Decided by the host of the game.

Whether or not placing two or more cards of the same value at once is allowed (placing two 5s in the same turn).
Whether or not placing an ace requires the same suit.
Whether a jack skips a player or reverses the order.
Whether or not jokers are used, if they are the next player must take 5 cards from the deck when they are player. Jokers are rarely used.
When using an ace of spades it may be placed on either the ace of hearts, or a 2 if any suit.

See also
Craits
Crazy Eights
Screw Your Neighbour
Irish Switch (Card Game)
Switch game for Windows Phone

References

British card games
Eights group
Year of introduction missing